Ayilyam Thirunal Gowri Rukmini Bayi was the Junior Maharani of Travancore styled Attingal Elaya Thampuran.

Early life 
Rukmini Bayi was born in 1809 to Princess Attham Thirunal, Senior Rani of Attingal of the Travancore Royal Household. She had a younger brother Swathi Thirunal Rama Varma.

Full title
Her Highness Sri Padmanabha Sevini Vanchipala Dyumani Raj Rajeshwari Maharani Ayilyam Thirunal Gowri Rukmini Bayi, Junior Maharani of Travancore.

References

Travancore royal family
1809 births
1837 deaths
Indian princesses
19th-century Indian women
19th-century Indian people
Women of the Kingdom of Travancore
People of the Kingdom of Travancore